Sociedade Esportiva e Recreativa Juventude (also referred to as Juventude, Juventude MT or SER Juventude MT) is a Brazilian association football team from the town of Primavera do Leste in Mato Grosso state. It is a separate club from the bigger Brazilian team Esporte Clube Juventude.

History
On May 23, 1982, Sociedade Esportiva e Recreativa Juventude was founded.

Achievements
 Campeonato Matogrossense:
 Winners (2): 2000, 2001
 Campeonato Matogrossense Second Division:
 Winners (1): 1990

Stadium

Their home stadium is the Estádio Asa Delta, which has a capacity of 5,000.

Club colors
The club colors are red and white.

Trivia
Juventude's logo represents a chimarrão gourd (or cuia de chimarrão, in Portuguese language).

References

External links
Arquivo de Clubes
Club reference

Association football clubs established in 1982
Juventude Sociedade Esportiva e Recreativa
1982 establishments in Brazil